ISO 15489 Information and documentation—Records management is an international standard for the management of business records, consisting of two (2) parts: Part 1: Concepts and principles and Part 2: Guidelines.  ISO 15489 is the first standard devoted specifically to records management; providing an outline for comprehensive assessment of full and partial records management programs.

Topics covered
 Metadata for records
 Records systems
 Policies
 Assigned responsibilities
 Monitoring of records
 Training supporting the effective management of records
 Recurrent analysis of business context
 Identification of records requirements
 Records controls
 Creation, capturing and managing of records

Related standards
The following standards have been developed by and are the direct responsibility of the ISO/TC 46/SC 11 Secretariat.

 ISO 13008:2012 – Information and documentation – Digital records conversion and migration process
 ISO/TR 13028:2010 – Information and documentation – Implementation guidelines for digitization of records
 ISO 15489-1:2016 – Information and documentation – Records management – Part 1: Concepts and principles
 ISO/TR 15489-2:2001 – Information and documentation – Records management – Part 2: Guidelines
 ISO 16175-1:2010 – Information and documentation – Principles and functional requirements for records in electronic office environments – Part 1: Overview and statement of principles
 ISO 16175-2:2011 – Information and documentation – Principles and functional requirements for records in electronic office environments – Part 2: Guidelines and functional requirements for digital records management systems
 ISO 16175-3:2010 – Information and documentation – Principles and functional requirements for records in electronic office environments – Part 3: Guidelines and functional requirements for records in business systems 
 ISO/TR 17068:2012 – Information and documentation – Trusted third party repository for digital records
 ISO/TR 18128:2014 – Information and documentation – Risk assessment for records processes and systems
 ISO 22310:2006 – Information and documentation – Guidelines for standards drafters for stating records management requirements in standards
 ISO 23081-1:2006 – Information and documentation – Records management processes – Metadata for records – Part 1: Principles
 ISO 23081-2:2009 – Information and documentation – Managing metadata for records – Part 2: Conceptual and implementation issues
 ISO/TR 23081-3:2011 – Information and documentation – Managing metadata for records – Part 3: Self-assessment method
 ISO/TR 26122:2008 – Information and documentation – Work process analysis for records
 ISO 30300:2011 – Information and documentation – Management systems for records – Fundamentals and vocabulary
 ISO 30301:2011 – Information and documentation – Management systems for records – Requirements
 ISO 30302:2015 – Information and documentation – Management systems for records – Guidelines for implementation

Usage
 Auditing
ISO Annex SL, management clause 7.5 Documented Information

See also
Records management
Information management
Information governance
Design Criteria Standard for Electronic Records Management Software Applications

References

Records management
Information management
Information governance
15489